The Elbasan script is a mid 18th-century alphabetic script created for the Albanian language Elbasan Gospel Manuscript, also known as the Anonimi i Elbasanit ("the Anonymous of Elbasan"), which is the only document written in it. The document was created at St. Jovan Vladimir's Church in central Albania, but is preserved today at the National Archives of Albania in Tirana. The script, like the manuscript, is named after the city of Elbasan, where it was invented, and although the manuscript isn't the oldest document written in Albanian, the script is the oldest out of seven known original scripts created for Albanian. Its 59 pages contain Biblical content written in a script of 40 letters, of which 35 frequently recur and 5 are rare.

Letters

Unicode

The Elbasan script (U+10500–U+1052F) was added to the Unicode Standard in June 2014 with the release of version 7.0.

Creation

The Elbasan Gospel Manuscript 
 
The Elbasan Gospel Manuscript comes from the Orthodox Christian monastery of St. Jovan Vladimir's Church in the village of Shijon, west of Elbasan. With the exception of a short 15th century Easter Gospel transcript, it was the oldest work of Albanian Orthodox literature, and the oldest Orthodox Bible translation into Albanian. The authorship of the document is a matter of speculation, see the main article on this topic for details.

The manuscript was purchased a little before or around World War II by the politician Lef Nosi, who possessed a remarkable personal library and was a notable collector. It was confiscated from him by the communist regime in 1945. It is now preserved in the National Archives of Albania. The albanologist and translator Injac Zamputi (1910–1998) transcribed the manuscript, after which the Elbasan Gospel was published in standard Albanian for the first time.

Anonymous authorship 

The author of the script remains unknown, though several hypothesis have been brough forward. The most accepted proposal comes from Mahir Domi in 1965, claiming the Moschopole typographer Gregory of Durrës to be the author of the script. Domi's hypothesis was later supported by Robert Elsie. 

The name "Papa Totasi" (father Totasi) is written on the cover's verso, thus sometimes the script is attributed to him.

Historical analysis 
Robert Elsie notes the author's desire to avoid foreign influences. The Latin, Greek and Arabic scripts had already been in use for Albanian, and the Cyrillic and Glagolitic scripts were also available. But the author chose to devise a new script specific to Albanian, reflecting what Elsie called "the wish of Albanian intellectuals" for a distinct writing system of their own. Furthermore, a surprisingly low number of loanwords appear in the manuscript: only three Latin loans, seven Turkish loans, and twenty-one loans from Biblical Greek (the language the manuscript was translated from). Elsie argues that the author's determination to root out loanwords becomes clear with the marked crossing out of the Turkish loan sheher and its replacement with the native term qytet.

Properties 
The Elbasan script exhibited a nearly one-to-one correspondence between sounds and letters, with only three exceptions, of which two were restricted to Greek loanwords. The modern Albanian alphabet, written in the Latin script, is phonemically regular for the standard pronunciation but it is not one-to-one because of the use of ten consonant digraphs.

Dots are used on three characters as inherent features to indicate varied pronunciation found in Albanian: single r represents the alveolar tap  but with a dot it becomes an alveolar trill , whereas a dotted l becomes velarized and a dotted d becomes prenasalized into nd. (Today this nd has become a sequence of two separate phonemes; Modern Greek has undergone somewhat similar development.) Elsie says that the script generally uses Greek letters with a line on top as numerals. While some of the letters appear to have been inspired by Greek or Glagolitic forms, he considers the majority to be unique for this script, whereas Shuteriqi and Domi see a strong influence of Old Church Slavonic language due to the jurisdiction, until 1767, of the Archbishopric of Ohrid.

See also 
Todhri script
Linguistic purism
Albanian alphabet
Vithkuqi script

Sources

External links 
 Free Elbasan Unicode font
 Google font Noto Sans for Elbasan
 Omniglot, a guide to written language - Albanian writing systems
 Elbasan Script Transliterator

Albanian scripts
Alphabets
Obsolete writing systems
Constructed scripts